Zimbabwean Hip hop is the variety of hip hop that is popular in Zimbabwe. It emerged in the early 1990s. Prominent artists include Voltz JT, Junior Brown, Calvin, Saintfloew, Holy Ten, Mahcoy, Asaph, Kriss Newtone,  Suhn, Cyprian, Denim Woods, Hanna, Tanto Wavie,  Diamond, Synik, Maskiri, Ex Q, TreyXL, Munetsi, Bling4, Tha Bees, Bagga We Ragga and Raykaz. Trap Music is its most popular subgenre.

History

1990–2000
During this period, hip hop emerged globally. The youth of Zimbabwe embraced it. The earliest recordings were mostly on vinyl and tape. As they were not converted to CDs, MP3s, or modern media,  they became rare. The mainstream acts of the time were Piece of Ebony, Fortune Muparutsa [with rap verses on songs like Rumors (1991)], and Midnight Magic with songs like "Blackness" featuring Mau Mau. Since most vinyl records and cassette tapes are no longer playable, Zimbabwe lost much of its earlier catalog, from which later generations could have drawn inspiration.

This also limited opportunities to sample from predecessors. During the second half of this period, beginning on their own and later with the influence of Innocent Tshuma (then known as The Millennium Man), youths began to participate. The instrumentation, form, and culture began to adopt American Hip hop trends, leaning less on the stagnant local Mbira Hip hop. Though exported globally by groups like Zimbabwe Legit, hip hop remained secondary to other genres such as Museve, Reggae, Kwaito, jazz, choral, folk and African House. In 2016, artists like Takura gathered a following. He was the first to be recognized during stiff competition with Zimdancehall.

2001–present
Since 2001 artists and promoters have branched out to form their own brands, record labels, and radio stations. This cost monopolists their grip on the industry and diluted their power in distribution, influence, airplay, and the ability to predict the next big artist. Artists began selling CDs in the streets. Shows such as Mashoko and The Circle at The Mannernburg in Harare helped popularize hip hop. Poets and emcees include Osama, Outspoken, Synik, Upmost, Godobori, Aura, Blackbird (now known as Temple), among others. Poets inserted politics into their music and started a movement known as House Of Hunger.

Mashoko later developed from a once-a-month festival known as Shoko Fest, which included international acts like Hired Gun (USA) and Akala, among others. Many Zimbabwean emcees performed at the show, ongoing since 2010. The same year, Zim Hip Hop Awards began.

Artists have recently begun to adopt digital distribution channels linked to social networks such as Music Clout. Music videos and promotional music are now used to gather followers. Prolific artists are now hiring or being approached by industry managers to handle their affairs in a more professional manner.

In 2018 female artists such as Tashamiswa gained popularity. She is one of the most important female participants. Currently, artists like Ti Gonzi and Holy Ten are also dominating the genre but are still being led by the legendary Maskiri. In 2020, during the lockdown period, new artists who rapped in English in a vernacular-dominated genre emerged—including Suhn, Cyprian, Denim Woods, Kriss Newtone, Obi Davids, Masimba, Hanna, Lucretius, and Raykaz. Tanto Wavie is also an important figure in the genre with this subgenre "Trap Su" which is basically Trap and Sungura, an indigenous combined Zimbabwean genre. New voices such as Dough Major and Dingo Duke who emerged with a subgenre later called Shebeen Rap, influenced by 90's kwaito, future bass, Afrobeats and 1980's funk. Another voice has been constantly raising and creating a new Zim Hip Hop wave subgenred as Jecha Trap influenced by a mixture of Zimbabwean Hip Hop culture mixed with other cultures from parts of Africa with fusioned with other styles like afro-swing, Maskandi Rap, Melodical Trap, Psychedelic Rap and Conscious Rap. The subgenre was created by Cyprian an SA based Zimbabwean Rapper and his fellow friend and collaborator Mfundo dyanose aka Killo Di King a xhosa Rapper from South Africa.

Style and influences

Influences
Hip hop's use of high tech equipment kept it fresh and relevant, re-birthed with each technological advancement. America continued to exert the greatest influence. Many local acts use the same flow and drum kits used by their favorite US rapper and producer.

Zimbabwean identity
A few acts are now moving away from the influence of American Hip hop, branding themselves as kings, nobles, and sons of renown. Some have resorted to remakes and remixes of old hit tracks, whereas others emphasize sampling traditional or folk songs and collaborating with bigger and more established names from other genres. Acts make more use of their traditional languages (Shona and Ndebele), and incorporate local instruments such as Mbira, Marimba, Ngoma (traditional drums) or Hosho (traditional shaker). Colonial-era acts like August Musarurwa and Simon Mashoko proved that influencing, inspiring, or impressing American musicians is possible as their tracks were sampled or covered by greats like Louis Armstrong and 213 (Snoop Dogg, Warren G, Nate Dogg), supporting the argument to establish distinct identities.

Media

Radio
Radio has helped the genre, in part by broadcasting podcasts such as Radio Kunakirwa, which are the only proof of the existence of some tracks. Radio catalogs and podcasts are now a vital source of history for the genre. Apart from airplay, some radio stations have segments dedicated to the genre.
 School of Hip Hop

 Zim Hip Hop Explosion

Television
A few shows dedicated to Hip-Hop on Zimbabwe's local broadcaster.
 HipHop263
 Fresh hip-hop zw
 HiphopZW

Blogs
Blogs are predominantly the drivers of Zim Hip Hop. One of the most influential writers was the late Donald "Dodger" Marindire whose work documented the culture for the past decade, inspiring many artists. Other media personalities that continue to document the culture include Denzel Sambo, Mukudzeyi Mlambo, Specktrum, Nova Bleq, Takudzwa Chiwanza & Takudzwa "Manando" Kudzura.

Major platforms Include:

 ZimSphere
 Nova Review
 THE263POST
 Zazise
 Greedy South
 EarGround
 Zim Hip Hop Circles
 Zim Hip Hip Hop Plugs

References